Eva Marian Hubback (13 April 1886 – 15 July 1949) was an English feminist and an early advocate of birth control and eugenics.

Early life
Eva Marian Spielmann was born on 13 April 1886, daughter of Sir Meyer Spielmann (1856–1936). Sir Meyer was one of the three surviving sons of the eight children of banker Adam Spielmann (1812–1869), who had emigrated from Schokken (now Skoki), near Posen (now Poznan) with his own two brothers. Eva was therefore the niece of the civil engineer turned art-connoisseur Sir Isidore Spielmann (1854–1925) as well as the renowned art-critic Marion Spielmann (1856–1936) and his wife, the children's author Mabel Spielmann (1862–1938). Through them she was related to the great dynasties of Montagu/Samuel and of Sebag-Montefiore.
 
She was educated at Saint Felix School, Southwold, Suffolk and Newnham College, Cambridge, graduating in 1908 with first class honours in the Economics tripos.
In February 1911 she married Francis William Hubback (1884–1917). They had three children, Diana, Rachel and David, before her husband died in February 1917 of wounds received in action during World War I.
She was director of economic studies at Newnham and Girton from 1916 to 1917.

Career
Hubback became involved in the women's suffrage movement, campaigning with Eleanor Rathbone.
From 1918 to 1927 she was Parliamentary Secretary, and later President of the National Union for Equal Citizenship, which successfully campaigned for reforms to the laws affecting the rights of women and children.
She became Principal of Morley College for Working Men and Women in 1927, succeeding Barbara Wootton.
In 1929 she joined the Eugenics Society, becoming a Fellow in 1931, member of the council in 1932 and member of the executive committee in 1934.
She assisted in establishing the Townswomen's Guild in 1930.
Eva Hubback, Shena Simon and Ernest Simon co-founded the Association for Education in Citizenship in 1933.
She became secretary of this association, and chairman of the Family Endowment Society.

From 1946 to 1948, Hubback represented Kensington North on the London County Council, elected on the Labour Party platform.
She died on 15 July 1949.

Bibliography

Further reading

References

1886 births
1949 deaths
English feminists
English people of Polish descent
Austen family
Members of London County Council
Women councillors in England